Roland Buerk (born 1973) is a former journalist who worked for the BBC. He was the Tokyo Correspondent for BBC News and covered of the 2011 Tōhoku earthquake and tsunami. He left the BBC in mid-2012, to work for Nissan in the United Arab Emirates. He is the son of former BBC newsreader presenter Michael Buerk.

Education
Buerk was educated at the Royal Grammar School, a day independent school for boys in his former hometown of Guildford in Surrey, followed by the University of Birmingham, from which he graduated with a degree in Political Science in 1995. He was the editor of the University's student newspaper, Redbrick, for the 1994-95 academic year.

Life and career
After graduation, Buerk joined Independent Television News (ITN) in London as a graduate news trainee, and was assigned to Channel 5 News as a producer after he completed an eighteen-month course. After leaving ITN, Buerk became a freelance correspondent in Bangladesh and filed news reports for the BBC. He survived the 2004 Asian tsunami and reported on the effects of the tsunami on BBC News.

In January 2009, Buerk was appointed as the Tokyo Correspondent and reported on the 2011 Tōhoku earthquake and tsunami and reported from inside the Fukushima Daiichi Nuclear Power Plant.

In 2012, Buerk left the BBC to work for the Japanese motor manufacturer Nissan, in the United Arab Emirates.

Personal life
In 2005, Buerk married Dr. Anna Moore, whom he met at Birmingham. Moore is credited with saving Buerk's life during the 2004 Asian tsunami, by waking him in their hotel bedroom in the coastal town of Unawatuna in Sri Lanka, moments before a large wave burst into the room.

Publications

 Breaking Ships (2006)

References

External links

1973 births
Living people
People educated at Royal Grammar School, Guildford
Alumni of the University of Birmingham
Place of birth missing (living people)
English reporters and correspondents
BBC newsreaders and journalists
5 News presenters and reporters